Cardinal Griffin Catholic College is a mixed Voluntary aided Catholic Secondary school and Sixth form college in Cannock, Staffordshire, England. Cardinal Griffin is a Specialist Science College.

History

On 22 October 1960, the foundation stone of the college was laid by Dom Basil Griffin OSB (died 1963). He was a monk at Douai Abbey in Woolhampton, Berkshire, and twin brother of Cardinal Griffin, who the college was named after. The college was built to educate the children of the four Catholic parishes in Cannock Chase. Those parishes were St Mary and St Thomas More in Cannock, Our Lady of Lourdes in Hednesford, St Joseph and Etheldreda in Rugeley and St Joseph in Burntwood.

The school has a house system that names each of the six school houses after past cardinals of the Catholic church in England. The houses are Allen, Newman, Manning, Vaughan, Wiseman and Hinsley.

The college has played the sport of Handball since 1980s. In 1982, they won the national under-15s final and in the early 1980s came fourth in the under-14 championship of a Europe-wide Handball tournament in Teramo.

In 2013, Ofsted inspected the school and rated it in overall effectiveness as 'Good' and behaviour and safety of pupils as 'Outstanding'. The overall effectiveness was an improvement from its previous inspection, which was rated as 'Satisfactory'.

Cannock Civic Observatory
In 2010 an observatory with two domes and what has been called the "largest collection of telescopes in the Midlands" was built on the school grounds. It was opened by Brother Guy Consolmagno SJ, the official Vatican Astronomer.

See also
 Archdiocese of Birmingham

References

External links
 
 
 Cannock Civic Observatories

Secondary schools in Staffordshire
Catholic secondary schools in the Archdiocese of Birmingham
Educational institutions established in 1960
1960 establishments in England
Voluntary aided schools in England
Cannock